The Department of Public Enterprises and Industrial Reconstruction of West Bengal is a Bengal government department. It is a department mainly responsible for coordinating tasks related to the revival of ailing industrial assets in the large and medium sectors in the State.

Ministerial team 
The ministerial team is headed by the Cabinet Minister for Industrial Reconstruction, who may or may not be supported by Ministers of State. Civil servants are assigned to them to manage the ministers' office and ministry.

The current head of the ministry is Partha Chatterjee.

References 

Government of West Bengal
Economy of West Bengal
Government departments of West Bengal
West Bengal